Jeanine Salagoïty (born Toulouse; 16 May 1923 – 29 December 2020) was a French athlete who specialised in the sprints.

Biography
Salagoïty was born in Lesparre-Médoc. She won ten  champion of France titles from 1939 to 1949: three in the 60 meters, four in the 100 meters and three in the 200 meters . She twice improved the French record in the 100 meters (12.1s in 1948 and  12.0s in 1949), as well as the 4 × 100 Metres Relay. She participated in the 1948 Olympics in London, where she reached the semi-finals of the 80m hurdles.

Achievements
 French Championships in Athletics   :  
 winner of 60 m 1939,  1946 and 1949   
 winner of the 100m 1941,  1942,  1945 and 1949   
 winner of 200 m 1941,  1942 and 1945

Records

References
 Olympic profile for Jeanine Toulouse at sports-reference.com
Olympedia: Jeanine Toulouse
 Avis de décès Jeanine SALAGOITY née TOULOUSE

1923 births
2020 deaths
French female sprinters
Olympic athletes of France
Athletes (track and field) at the 1948 Summer Olympics
Olympic female sprinters